Prince Ioan Grigore Ghica (10 December 1830 – 21 March 1881) was a Romanian politician who served as the Minister of Foreign Affairs of Principality of Romania from 29 September 1862 to 29 August 1863. He also served as the Minister of National Defense of Principality of Romania in two terms from 19 July 1861 until 29 September 1862, and from 11 May 1866 until 5 August 1866. He was the son of the last Prince of Moldavia Grigore Alexandru Ghica. Ioan Grigore Ghica also served as the ambassador to Istanbul, Vienna, Rome and Saint Petersburg.

See also
Ghica family
Foreign relations of Romania

References

1830 births
1881 deaths
Politicians from Iași
Romanian Ministers of Foreign Affairs
Romanian Ministers of Defence
Romanian people of Albanian descent
Ambassadors of Romania to the Ottoman Empire
Ambassadors of Romania to Austria-Hungary
Ambassadors of Romania to Russia
Ambassadors of Romania to Italy
Diplomats from Iași